Szabolcs Mihai Perényi (born 5 July 1982) is a Romanian-born Hungarian former professional football player.

Honours

Club
Dinamo București
 Romanian League Championship: 2003–04
 Cupa României: 2003–04
Jiul Petroşani
 Romanian Second League: 2004–05

External links

1982 births
Living people
People from Carei
Romanian sportspeople of Hungarian descent
Romanian footballers
Association football defenders
FC Dinamo București players
FC Politehnica Iași (1945) players
CSM Jiul Petroșani players
FCV Farul Constanța players
Expatriate footballers in Hungary
Nyíregyháza Spartacus FC players
Romanian expatriate sportspeople in Hungary
FCM Câmpina players